Tatarpur Lallu is a big village in Bijnor district in the Indian state of Uttar Pradesh.

Demographics
 India census, Tatarpur Lallu had a population of 5,967. Males constitute 54% of the population and females 46%. Adarsh Nagar has an average literacy rate of 71%, higher than the national average of 59.5%: male literacy is 77%, and female literacy is 63%. In Adarsh Nagar, 14% of the population is under 6 years of age.

References

Cities and towns in Bijnor district